Cloak & Dagger is an arcade game released by Atari, Inc. in March 1984 as a tie-in to the 1984 film Cloak & Dagger. The game saw limited arcade release as a conversion kit for Robotron: 2084 cabinets.

Gameplay 

Cloak & Dagger is a multidirectional shooter game.

Development and release 

The game was created by Russel Dawe. The game was under development using the title Agent X when the movie producers and Atari learned of each other's projects and decided to cooperate. When Atari was consulted to provide a game as an element of the movie, they tweaked Agent X and renamed it Cloak & Dagger. Dabney Coleman's character was then named "Agent X" in the movie. The film shows an Atari 5200 version of the game, but the cartridge props are actually other 5200 games with a Cloak & Dagger label stuck on them and the screenshots are of arcade version. A 5200 port was planned, but not completed.

A port for the Atari 8-bit family was being developed by Atari, Inc. employee Dave Comstock in 1984, but was never finished.

Reception 
Computer and Video Games gave Cloak & Dagger an overall positive outlook.

References

External links 

 Cloak & Dagger at GameFAQs
 Cloak & Dagger at Killer List of Videogames
 Cloak & Dagger at MobyGames

1984 video games
Arcade video games
Arcade-only video games
Atari arcade games
Cancelled Atari 8-bit family games
Spy video games
Video games based on films
Video games developed in the United States